This chart represents the Colombian National Police officer rank insignia.

Ranks

Officers

Non-commissioned officers and enlisted

See also
Police rank

References

External links
 Colombian National Police officer ranks

National Police of Colombia
Police ranks by country